Sadat Karim (born 24 October 1991) is a Ghanaian professional footballer who plays as a forward for Greek Super League 2 club Apollon Smyrnis.

He started his career at local club Kumasi Barcelona Babies F.C in Kumasi, Ghana.

Sadat Karim was born on 24 October 1991 in Kumasi in the Ashanti Region of Ghana, the third of the five children of his parents. He has an elder sister and an elder brother while also having two younger sisters. Sadat is a Muslim. He started his formal education at Asawasi Presbyterian International School where he wrote his BECE Exams with an excellent grade of 6As. Then he went to Prempeh College for high school education while playing for King Faisal Babes FC in the Ghana Premier League.

Sadat Karim started playing football at the age of 7 at Kumasi Barcelona Football Club, a team good for player development in Kumasi.  He then moved to King Faisal Babes FC at the age of 17 while still at High School.

References

External links

1991 births
Living people
Ghanaian footballers
Landskrona BoIS players
International Allies F.C. players
KSF Prespa Birlik players
Footballers from Kumasi
BW 90 IF players
Halmstads BK players
Superettan players
Ettan Fotboll players
Ghanaian expatriate footballers
Expatriate footballers in Sweden
Ghanaian expatriate sportspeople in Sweden
Association football forwards
Real Tamale United players